Arundel & Wick is an electoral division of West Sussex in the United Kingdom and returns one member to sit on West Sussex County Council.

Extent
The division covers the town of Arundel; the villages of Burpham, Houghton, Lyminster, South Stoke, Tortington and Warningcamp, and the communities of Toddington and Wick which form part of the urban area of Littlehampton.

It comprises the following Arun District wards: Arundel Ward and Wick with Toddington Ward; and of the following civil parishes: Arundel, Burpham, Houghton, the northern part of Littlehampton, Lyminster & Crossbush, South Stoke and Warningcamp.

Election results

2013 Election
Results of the election held on 2 May 2013

2009 Election
Results of the election held on  4 June 2009:

2005 Election
Results of the election held on 5 May 2005:

References
Election Results - West Sussex County Council

External links
 West Sussex County Council
 Election Maps

Electoral Divisions of West Sussex